Marshall Bennett Islands (also known as the Marshall Bennets) are several islands in Milne Bay, Papua New Guinea.

Geography
They consist of:

 Gawa
 Dugumenu 
 Iwa Island
 Kwaiawata 
 Egum Atoll with 12 islands
 Yanaba Island (reef) 
 Egom (lagoon)
 uninhabited islands on the fringing reef (clockwise starting west)
 Digaragara
 Wiakau (second largest island)
 Napasa
 unnamed island
 Tabunagora
 Nagian
 uninhabited islands in the lagoon
 Mua
 Fandaio
 Simlakita
 Nasakori (Panamote)

They are usually considered to be part of the Woodlark Islands group. Of the islands only Dugumenu is uninhabited but is used by neighbouring islanders for the growing of coconuts.

References

Archipelagoes of Papua New Guinea
.M
Woodlark Islands